Keshavarzeh may refer to:

Keshavarzeh-ye Olya
Keshavarzeh-ye Sofla